The Liberal Reform Party was an Australian political party, active in New South Wales state politics between 1901 and 1916. It drew much of its support from Protestant and Temperance groups.

History
The question of tariff policy which, had created and divided the Free Trade Party and Protectionist Party in New South Wales in the 1890s, became a federal issue at the time of federation. Deprived of their main ideological difference, the two parties were recreated as the Liberal Reform Party, aligned with the federal Free Trade Party, and the Progressive Party, aligned with the federal Protectionist Party.  The Progressive Party's vote collapsed at the 1904 election and many of its members then joined the Liberal Reform Party. By 1907, the Liberal Reform Party was left as the main centre-right party in New South Wales.

In 1916, the Liberal Reform Party formed a coalition with the pro-conscription elements of the state Labor Party under Premier William Holman. In 1917, Liberal Reform merged with the pro-conscription elements of Labor to form the New South Wales branch of the Nationalist Party of Australia. As was the case with the federal Nationalists, the new party was dominated by former Liberal Reformers, but Holman was the merged party's leader.

Leaders

State election results

References

Defunct liberal political parties
Defunct political parties in New South Wales
Political parties established in 1901
Political parties disestablished in 1916
1901 establishments in Australia
1916 disestablishments in Australia